Wing Fai Centre is a Home Ownership Scheme and Private Sector Participation Scheme court in Luen Wo Hui, Fanling, New Territories, Hong Kong next to Wing Fok Centre. It has a total of four residential blocks built in 1996.

Houses

Demographics
According to the 2016 by-census, Wing Fai Centre had a population of 4,061. The median age was 45.9 and the majority of residents (95.7%) were of Chinese ethnicity. The average household size was 3.1 people. The median monthly household income of all households (i.e. including both economically active and inactive households) was HK$34,210.

Politics
Wing Fai Centre is located in Luen Wo Hui constituency of the North District Council. It is currently represented by Chow Kam-ho, who was elected in the 2019 elections.

See also

Public housing estates in Fanling

References

Fanling
Home Ownership Scheme
Private Sector Participation Scheme
Residential buildings completed in 1996